Borghi is an Italian surname.

Geographical distribution
As of 2014, 75.0% of all known bearers of the surname Borghi were residents of Italy (frequency 1:2,767), 13.3% of Brazil (1:52,225), 5.6% of Argentina (1:25,921), 2.3% of the United States (1:526,605) and 1.9% of France (1:115,867).

In Italy, the frequency of the surname was higher than national average (1:2,767) in the following regions:
 1. Emilia-Romagna (1:474)
 2. Lombardy (1:1,121)
 3. Tuscany (1:2,470)

People
Adelaide Borghi-Mamo (1826–1901), Italian operatic mezzo-soprano
Alessandro Borghi (disambiguation)
Ayres Borghi-Zerni (fl. 1895–1928), Italian operatic soprano 
Catherine Borghi (born 1976), Swiss alpine skier
Christel Borghi, Swiss figure skater
Claudio Borghi (born 1964), Argentine footballer and manager
Frank Borghi (1925–2015), American soccer player
Henri Borghi, O.S.M. (1609–1658), Roman Catholic prelate, Bishop of Alife 
Luigi Borghi (c.1745–c.1806), Italian composer who worked in London
Max Borghi (born 2000), American football player
Paolo Borghi (born 1961), Italian high jumper
Ruggero Borghi (born 1970), Italian cyclist

References

Italian-language surnames
Surnames of Italian origin